Piero Ballerini (20 March 1901 – 30 June 1955) was an Italian screenwriter and film director.

Selected filmography
 Golden Arrow (1935)
 Bridge of Glass (1940)
 The Prisoner of Santa Cruz (1941)
 Two Hearts (1943)
 Immigrants (1948)
 Alguien se acerca  (1948): Unreleased 1948 Argentine film
 Peppino e la vecchia signora (1954)

References

Bibliography
 Brunetta, Gian Piero. The History of Italian Cinema: A Guide to Italian Film from Its Origins to the Twenty-first Century.  Princeton University Press, 2009.

External links

1901 births
1955 deaths
20th-century Italian screenwriters
Italian film directors
People from Como
Italian male screenwriters
20th-century Italian male writers